Frances was a cutter built in 1839 at Encounter Bay, South Australia.  It was wrecked on South Neptune Island on 29 August 1840.
It was reported that the crew survived the wrecking event, came ashore and survived on a diet of penguin for 50 days before sending 2 people in a dinghy to Port Lincoln to seek help.  Those remaining at South Neptune Island were subsequently rescued. 

See also
List of shipwrecks of Australia

References

Shipwrecks of South Australia
Maritime incidents in August 1840
1839 ships